Rabiosa may refer to:

 Rabiosa (grape), a white Italian grape variety
 Rabiosa (river), a tributary of the Plessur river in Switzerland
 Rabiosa (song), a song by a Colombian singer-songwriter, Shakira
 Rabiosa di Asolo, a white Italian grape variety